Michael Angelo Batio, also known as Michael Angelo, Mike Batio or MAB, is an American heavy metal guitarist and columnist from Chicago, Illinois. He was the lead guitarist for the Los Angeles-based glam metal band Nitro in the late 1980s and early 1990s. He is currently serving as the touring guitarist for the American heavy metal band Manowar.

Batio's work has encompassed many genres, but he is best known for playing heavy metal and its subgenres such as neoclassical metal,  and speed metal. Batio has an advanced knowledge of music theory, having a deep understanding of complex scale combinations and time signatures which assist him in his compositions. He is widely known for his technical mastery of the fretboard and his extremely fast picking and sweep picked arpeggios. He is also known for his showmanship during performances, particularly his use of the "MAB Over Under" technique, which he invented and for his ability to play a double-necked and quad-necked guitar, using both hands to play.  Batio is also noted for his guitar instruction DVDs in the "Speed Kills" series which teach shred guitar techniques and how to "master the art of playing lightning fast".

Batio was voted the "No. 1 Fastest Guitar Shredder of All Time" by Guitar One Magazine in 2003.

Biography

Early life and career
Batio was born and raised in Chicago, Illinois to an Italian father and a German mother. He started playing the piano and composing  music at the age of five, and first played guitar at the age of ten. By twelve he was playing in bands in youth clubs, churches, and shows, playing for 10–12 hours on the weekends. By the age of thirteen his guitar teacher told him, "I can't teach you any more. You're faster at thirteen than I was at 22." He started listening to and watching professionals and sitting down and trying to work out riffs and tunes.

He attended Northeastern Illinois University and achieved a Bachelor of Arts degree in Music Theory and Composition. After he had graduated, Batio looked to become a session guitarist in his hometown. When he asked for a job at a nearby studio, he was given a piece of music and simply asked to play it. He managed to play it adding his own improvisations and fills, making him the studio's primary call-out guitarist. As a session player, Batio recorded music for such companies as Burger King, Pizza Hut, Taco Bell, KFC, United Airlines, United Way, McDonald's, Beatrice Corp. and the Chicago Wolves hockey team.

Holland, the Michael Angelo Band and Nitro (1984–1993)
Batio began his recording career in 1984 when he joined new Chicago-based heavy metal band Holland, an eponymous project set up by ex-Steppenwolf singer Tommy Holland. With major label Atlantic Records, the band released their debut studio album in 1985 entitled Little Monsters, which saw moderate success in the United States. The band split up soon after, and a compilation of material from the Little Monsters sessions, Wake Up the Neighborhood, was released in 1999 through Batio's label M.A.C.E. Music.

After the breakup of Holland, Batio started his own eponymous band with singer Michael Cordet, bassist Allen Hearn and drummer Paul Cammarata. The band did not release any albums, though three of their songs appeared on the 1998 Nitro compilation Gunnin' for Glory.

In 1987, after the breakup of Holland, Batio joined glam metal artist Jim Gillette on his solo album "Proud to Be Loud", before founding the band Nitro with bassist T.J. Racer and drummer Bobby Rock. In 1989 Nitro released their first studio album, O.F.R., from which they released two singles, "Freight Train" and "Long Way From Home". The music video for "Freight Train", which received much airplay on MTV, was notable for featuring Batio playing his now famous 'Quad Guitar', a notion which FHM magazine voted one of the "50 most outrageous moments in rock history".

1987 was also the year Batio released his first instructional video with "Star Licks Productions" as part of the "Masters Series" and was one of the first recognized metal guitarists to record instructional videos. This video was the very first "shred" instructional program showing many modern guitar concepts for the first time.

By 1992, Rock and Racer had been replaced by Johnny Thunder and Ralph Carter respectively, and it was in this year that they released their second studio album entitled Nitro II: H.W.D.W.S.. Included on the album was a cover of Ted Nugent's "Cat Scratch Fever", which the band also integrated into a music video. Nitro disbanded shortly afterwards.

Solo career (1993–present)
In April 1993, Batio founded his own record label, M.A.C.E. Music, which became one of the first labels online in 1996. He used this label when he began recording his first album, No Boundaries, which he released in 1995. Batio's second studio release was Planet Gemini in 1997, which showed a very progressive, experimental side to his playing. In 1999, Batio released his second instructional video, Jam With Angelo, which came with his third studio album as a companion CD: Tradition. This was quickly followed by a fourth full-length album in 2000, Lucid Intervals and Moments of Clarity, which was credited to "Mike Batio and Rob Ross", the latter being the drummer.

In 2001, Batio released a CD with his band "C4," covering songs from his Holland years and including the original "Call to Arms."  It was his 1st all vocal CD since recording with Nitro. Batio and C4 were featured on "Rock My Ass", a TV show self-described as "Chicago's live music venue from your couch". This was not Batio's first appearance on the show, having also appeared in 1999 with a band called No Remorse.

In 2003, Batio released his first DVD, the title release in his Speed Kills series, followed by the second, Speed Lives, in 2004. It was also in this year that Batio released a compilation album, Lucid Intervals and Moments of Clarity Part 2, which featured songs from Tradition and Lucid Intervals.

In 2005, Batio released his highly anticipated cover/tribute/studio album, Hands Without Shadows, which featured guest appearances from such musicians as Mark Tremonti (of Alter Bridge fame), Rudy Sarzo (of Ozzy Osbourne, Quiet Riot, Whitesnake and Dio fame) and virtuoso newcomer Bill Peck. In 2006, DVD Speed Kills 2 was released, in addition to the first in the new Hands Without Shadows series, Performance. Batio's latest release came in 2007, when his first two albums - No Boundaries and Planet Gemini - were remixed and remastered with additional drums, for an album entitled 2 X Again; the title of a song from the first album. Angelo also released three DVDs in 2007: Speed Kills 3, 25 Jazz Progressions and MAB Jam Session.

In 2011, Batio debuted his multimedia show "Hands Without Shadows - A Tribute to Rock Guitar" in Las Vegas. In 2012 Batio toured the world with this show. It was a chronological tribute to rock guitar. Batio toured the world with the tribute to rock guitar show in 2013 and 2014. Batio is currently performing concerts featuring his original music mixed with several songs from his tribute to rock guitar show.

Batio has been listed as one of the "Top 100 Greatest Metal Guitarists of All Time" by Guitar World Magazine, for which he wrote the column Time to Burn, and one of the "20 Greatest Shredders of All Time" by Total Guitar Magazine, both in April 2008. Batio also won the 2009 Guitar World Magazine Readers Choice award in the "Best Shredder" category. In November 2011, Batio won the Guitar World Magazine Readers Choice Award and was voted the "Fastest Guitarist of All Time." Over 440,000 votes were cast.

On September 2, 2022, Manowar announced that Batio will join the band for their 2023 world tour.

Film appearance
In 1991, Batio's guitar work appeared in the low budget horror film Shock 'Em Dead, recording tracks for the soundtrack as well as playing the guitar parts of the demonically possessed main character Angel Martin in close ups.

Style

Batio plays extremely fast and well articulated alternate picking, which he credits to his use of anchoring, or planting the fingers he does not use on the body of the guitar while picking to restrict motion. He is also adept at fluid, sweep-picked arpeggios and tapping. Batio has cited F-sharp minor and F-sharp phrygian dominant as two of his favorite keys. He has described F sharp minor as a "demonic" key, giving a dark, evil sound. Batio invented and often demonstrates the "reach-around" technique, which involves flipping his fretting hand over and under the neck rapidly, playing the guitar both regularly and like a piano.

He is ambidextrous, a skill he taught himself. This enables him to play two guitars at the same time either in synchronization or using separate harmonies. This includes playing completely different parts at once, as shown while playing his famous Double-Guitar. Though naturally left-handed, he plays as right-handed when playing one guitar.

Batio gave lessons to guitarist Tom Morello (of Rage Against the Machine and Audioslave fame) while at college. Morello has credited MAB with teaching him in a feature article in Guitar World Magazine in 2005. Batio also gave lessons to guitarist Mark Tremonti after Creed broke up and Tremonti wanted to learn more techniques.

Batio has a deep interest in European medieval history, castles and architecture, and is often seen wearing an all-black outfit with chains and other designs related to the medieval period. Many of his guitars have been designed to feature chainmail and flames in the artwork.

Equipment

Guitars

Batio has an extensive collection of around 170 guitars, which he has accumulated since the 1980s. Among his instruments are a Dave Bunker "Touch guitar" (double neck with both bass and guitar, similar to the Chapman Stick), a mint-condition 1968 Fender Mustang, a 1986 Fender Stratocaster 1962 re-issue and several other vintage and custom-built guitars. Among his custom-made guitars is a 29-fret guitar made of military-grade aluminum, which makes the guitar very light. For live performances Batio is an exclusive user of Dean Guitars, both electric and acoustic. In 2007 he designed and developed a signature guitar with Dean, known as the MAB1 Armor Flame. Another signature piece of equipment Batio developed is the "MAB Hands Without Shadows" pickup, which he uses in his Double Guitar when touring. The pickup is specially designed for shred guitar, and provides the clean tone Batio is accustomed to. The Armor Flame, Batio's signature guitar, uses EMG 81, 85 and SA pickups, as his signature DMT pickups were still being developed at that time.

Earlier on in his career when he was first endorsed by Dean guitars he also embraced Dean's tradition of popularizing Dimarzio pickups and had used Dimarzios in his guitars. These include the Dimarzio PAF, Super Distortion (sometimes using the Super Distortion both in the neck and bridge position, as he did in his Gibson Charvel Circuit Board double guitar. This was the main setup during the recording of No Boundaries). Batio has also used pickups of other brands including Seymour Duncan, namely the Pearly Gates and JB models and also Bill Lawrence pickups. Currently other than using EMGs in his signature guitar he also has a collection of the other brand pickups in his Dean limited edition collectors' models, such as Dimarzio Custom Super Distortions (based on the Super 2 and Super Distortion) in his USA Dean Time capsule Blue Burst ML and the Seymour Duncan pair he used (refer to above) in his USA Dean Collectors edition Hardtail.

Double Guitar

Batio was the inventor of the Double Guitar, a V-shaped, twin-neck guitar which can be played both right- and left-handed. The first version of this instrument was actually two separate guitars simply played together, as opposed to being one entity. A Flying V was fastened to a snare drum in a left-handed position, while another one was strapped around his shoulder. The next version of the guitar, as designed by Batio and guitar technician Kenny Breit, featured a flight case latch attached to the back of each guitar, which could reportedly be assembled in five seconds. By far his most famous and definitely his most photographed double guitar is his USA Dean Mach 7 Jet Double Guitar along with its custom Anvil flight case. One of his inspirations for the radical design was jazz saxophonist Rahsaan Roland Kirk, who was known for playing two or three instruments simultaneously. Batio saw Kirk in concert during his teens, and said the jazz musician "blew his mind."

When the Double Guitar was first used in concert, Batio noticed that the guitars created a lot of feedback when played together. He decided that he needed to invent a way to 'dampen' the strings when both guitars were played at the same time, hence the invention of the "MAB String Dampener", which is now available to buy from M.A.C.E. Music.

The Double Guitar was recently named as the 8th "coolest guitar in rock" by online music magazine Gigwise. His iconic Dean 'Jet' Double Guitar has been inducted into the Rock and Roll Hall of Fame Museum and was put on permanent display in February 2012. This guitar was built by Mike Lipe for Dean Guitars.

The Quad Guitar
As well as the Double Guitar, Michael Angelo also invented and designed the Quad Guitar. The guitar was originally built in conjunction with Gibson, and built by Wayne Charvel in California. The top two guitars have seven strings, while the bottom two have the regular six. The first Quad, as used in the video for Nitro's "Freight Train", was stolen in El Paso, Texas after the second show of Nitro's O.F.R. tour. When Batio was performing in November 2004, a young fan named Simon Jones and his father turned up with a guitar case which held inside the two top guitars of the Quad, as found by Mick Seymour. Dean designed and had Mike Lipe build a new Quad Guitar in 2008.

The Quad Guitar was recently named as the 2nd "coolest guitar in rock" by online music magazine Gigwise.

Effects
In his years with Nitro, Batio used Boss overdrive (DS-1, SD-1) pedals. In his later years, beginning with his first solo album "No Boundaries," Batio used and still uses the original TS-9 Tube Screamer. He has vintage TS-9 pedals in his studio, that are only for recording and newer ones that he uses on tour.

In the studio, Batio also uses the following effects pedals:

Vintage Digitech Whammy
Dunlop Cry Baby
Vintage Digitech 256 multifx
Eventide Eclipse

Rocktron Chameleon Pre amp
Rocktron Voodoo Valve Pre amp
Rocktron Intellifex
Rocktron Replifex

Amplification
During his years with Nitro, Batio used Randall amplifiers. However, he used a Marshall amp early in his career, a JCM 800 (which was modified, mainly by Jose Arrendondo). In later years he made particular use of the JCM 900, when recording No Boundaries, and has primarily used this and other Marshall amps since. Currently, Batio typically uses Marshall JCM 2000 amps on tour, which also appear on his more recent studio records. In the studio, he also uses the Marshall JMP-1 preamp and Rocktron Chameleon and Voodoo Valve preamps. Batio's cabinet setup consists of 4x12 Marshall cabinets loaded with Celestion Vintage 30s and Greenbacks, in mono and stereo.

Other equipment

Strings
Batio uses Ernie Ball guitar strings, favoring the .009 to .042 models for soloing and most rhythm guitar parts while thicker gauge strings are used for detuned guitars. The acoustic gauge is normally .010 to .047 or .011 to .052.

Picks
For most of his career, Batio used Dunlop Jazz III picks as his guitar pick of choice, and has used the 'teardrop' shape of pick since he first started playing. However, in 2016, Batio released the "Michael Angelo Batio Signature 1.3mm Dura Picks, Premium Shredder Jazz Shaped Pick" from ChromaCast. These picks are a slightly larger version of his former favorite Dunlop Jazz III picks, made with a different material. For his acoustic work, Batio will sometimes use different picks.

Discography
No Boundaries (1995)
Planet Gemini (1997)
Tradition (1999)
Lucid Intervals and Moments of Clarity (2000)
Holiday Strings (2001)
Lucid Intervals and Moments of Clarity Part 2 (2004)
Hands Without Shadows (2005)
2 X Again (2007)
Hands Without Shadows 2 – Voices (2009)
Backing Tracks (2010)
Intermezzo (2013)
Shred Force 1: The Essential MAB (2015)
Soul in Sight (2016)
More Machine Than Man (2020)

References

External links

2015 Michael Angelo Batio Interview on Guitar.com

American heavy metal guitarists
Living people
Nitro (band) members
Northeastern Illinois University alumni
Lead guitarists
American people of Italian descent
American people of German descent
American music educators
Guitarists from Chicago
20th-century American guitarists
Shout (band) members
Educators from Illinois
21st-century American guitarists
Year of birth missing (living people)